Drew Ray Tanner is a Canadian actor best known for his role as Fangs Fogarty on Riverdale.

Early life
Tanner was born in Victoria, British Columbia. When he was two years old, his father left, and his mother decided to move to Aldergrove, in Fraser Valley, British Columbia, where Tanner was raised. His mother is a teacher and he has an older brother. Tanner's grandfather would often do magic tricks and involve Tanner when he was child, which inspired him to join the entertainment industry. In eighth and ninth grade, Tanner participated in a local improv group. He attended Aldergrove Community Secondary School and later transferred to W. J. Mouat Secondary School. He also played football. Tanner received the role of John Proctor in a production of The Crucible at his school. During his teenage years, Tanner also formed a rap group with a friend. Following his high school graduation, Tanner turned down football scholarships and began working at a local tire retread plant so that he could support himself and travel to Vancouver for auditions.

Career
In 2015, Tanner auditioned for the roles of Jughead Jones and Reggie Mantle in Riverdale, but did not receive either role. In 2016, Tanner's friends invited him to visit Rocko's Diner in Mission, British Columbia, which is famous for its milkshakes and was used as the filming location for diner scenes in Riverdale. When they arrived, there was a line of fans around the corner and Tanner made it his goal to have a role on Riverdale. When season two of the show began casting, Tanner auditioned for the role of Sweet Pea. While auditioning, he noted they were also casting for the role of Fangs Fogarty, so Tanner went in and auditioned for Fangs's character as well. Tanner joined the cast of Riverdale as Fangs Fogarty, the love interest of Kevin Keller, during season two, which began airing in 2017. Originally, Tanner was only supposed to appear in a couple episodes, but he was brought back several times until season four, when he his character had a role in a major story arc. After three years in a recurring role, Tanner was promoted to be a series regular for season five of the show, which aired in 2021.

Tanner and his Riverdale co-star Vanessa Morgan bonded on set over their love of music and formed a group, These Girls These Boys. They released their first single, Sleep When I'm Dead, in May 2020.

In 2019, Tanner appeared in the Netflix film Work It as the romantic interest of one of the main characters. The role required Tanner to engage in improvisational acting. To prepare for the role, he lost nineteen pounds in twenty-one days through an intensive diet and training program.

Personal life
Tanner is biracial. Tanner lived with his co-star Charles Melton during the [[COVID-19 pandemic.

Filmography

Film

Television

References

External links

Living people
Canadian male film actors
Canadian male television actors
Male actors from Victoria, British Columbia
Year of birth missing (living people)